This is a list of active airlines (2019) which have an Air Operator Certificate issued by the Civil Aviation Authority  of Paraguay.

See also
List of airlines
List of airlines of South America
List of defunct airlines of Paraguay

References

 
Airlines
Paraguay
Airlines
Paraguay